The AIC Serie A Foreign Footballer of the Year was a yearly award organized by the Italian Footballers' Association (AIC) given to the non-Italian footballer who was considered to have performed the best over the previous Serie A season. Diego Milito was the last recipient of the award in 2010. The award was part of the Oscar del Calcio awards event.

Winners

By club

By country

By position

References

External links
 List of Oscar del Calcio winners on the AIC official website
 List of Gran Galà del Calcio winners on the AIC official website

Serie A trophies and awards
Oscar del Calcio
Awards established in 1997
Lists of footballers in Italy
Association football player non-biographical articles